Derek Guy Steward (9 October 1928 – 12 October 2017) was a New Zealand sprinter and hurdler who won a bronze medal representing his country at the 1950 British Empire Games.

Early life and family
Born on Onehunga on 9 October 1928, Steward was the son of Albert de Bolton Peel Steward and Doris Steward (née Pilcher) of Paeroa. He was educated at King's College in Auckland.

Athletics
In 1946, Steward won the under-19 men's 120 yards hurdles title at the New Zealand national athletics championships. He went on to win the senior national 440 yards hurdles title in 1949 and 1955.

At the 1950 British Empire Games in Auckland, Steward was part of the New Zealand foursome—alongside Dave Batten, John Holland and Jack Sutherland—that won the bronze medal in the men's 4 x 440 yards relay. He also competed in the men's 440 yards hurdles: he won his heat in a time of 54.4 seconds, but finished fourth in his semifinal and did not progress further.

Death
Steward died on 12 October 2017.

References

Athletes at the Games by John Clark, page 128 (1998, Athletics New Zealand) 

1928 births
2017 deaths
Athletes from Auckland
People educated at King's College, Auckland
New Zealand male hurdlers
New Zealand male sprinters
Commonwealth Games bronze medallists for New Zealand
Athletes (track and field) at the 1950 British Empire Games
Commonwealth Games medallists in athletics
Medallists at the 1950 British Empire Games